is a 1994 Japanese film directed by Kon Ichikawa. The film is another version of the Chūshingura, the story of the revenge of the forty-seven rōnin of Ako against Lord Kira.

Plot
The story of the forty-seven rōnin has been depicted in many ways, with each version focusing the emphasis on different parts of the story—the rivalry of Lords Asano and Kira, Asano's assault on Kira, Asano's sentence of seppuku immediately afterward, and the revenge attack 21 months later against Kira by the forty-seven loyal retainers. Oishi Kuranosuke, Asano's chamberlain and the head of the 47 samurai, is often the primary character, and his actions are often held up as the epitome of bushido, the honor code of the samurai.

In this telling, the emphasis is on the preparation for and the attack on Kira's castle. The immediate reactions to Lord Asano's assault on Lord Kira are shown in flashback, and Lord Asano and the actual assault are barely shown at all.

Unlike other versions of the story, Oishi Kuranosuke does not pretend to descend into a life of debauchery, and Kira is shown as expecting the attack.

Cast
Ken Takakura … Kuranosuke Ōishi
Kiichi Nakai … Matashirō Irobe
Koichi Iwaki … Kazuemon Fuwa
Ryudo Uzaki … Yasubei Horibe
Tatsuo Matsumura … Yahei Horibe
Misa Shimizu … Hori
Koichi Iwaki : Fuwa Kazuemon
Atsuo Nakamura : Hara Sōemon
Shigeru Kōyama : Onodera Junai
Hisashi Igawa : Okuda Magodayou
Akiji Kobayashi : Ōno Kurobei
Jun Hashizume : Asano Takuminokami
Nenji Kobayashi : Shindo Genshiro
Kō Nishimura : Kira Yoshinaka
Kōji Ishizaka : Yanagisawa Yoshiyasu
Ruriko Asaoka : Riku
Hisaya Morishige : Chisaka

Accolades

Won
Tokyo International Film Festival 1994:
Special Jury Prize: (Kon Ichikawa)
Hochi Film Awards 1994:
Best Supporting Actor: (Kiichi Nakai)
Asia-Pacific Film Festival 1995:
Best Music: (Kensaku Tanikawa)
Awards of the Japanese Academy 1995:
Best Art Direction: (Yoshirō Muraki)
Best Editing: (Chizuko Osada)
Best Sound: (Tetsuya Ohashi)
Best Supporting Actor: (Kiichi Nakai)
Kinema Junpo Awards 1995:
Best Supporting Actor: (Kiichi Nakai)
Mainichi Film Concours 1995:
Readers' Choice Award — Best Film: (Kon Ichikawa)

Nominated
Awards of the Japanese Academy 1995:
Best Actor: (Ken Takakura)
Best Cinematography: (Yukio Isohata)
Best Director: (Kon Ichikawa)
Best Film
Best Lighting: (Kazuo Shimomura)
Best Music Score: (Kensaku Tanikawa)
Best Screenplay: (Kon Ichikawa, Kaneo Ikegami & Hiroshi Takeyama)

References

External links

Films about the Forty-seven Ronin
Films directed by Kon Ichikawa
Jidaigeki films
Samurai films
Films with screenplays by Kon Ichikawa
1990s Japanese films